Thaia is a monotypic genus of flowering plants from the orchid family, Orchidaceae. The sole species is Thaia saprophytica, native to Laos and Thailand.

Thaia was previously tentatively placed in the tribe Neottieae, but is now is placed as the only genus in the tribe Thaieae.

See also 
 List of Orchidaceae genera

References

External links 

Epidendroideae
Myco-heterotrophic orchids
Orchids of Thailand
Orchids of Laos
Plants described in 1975